Leonardo Martins Neiva, better known as Léo Neiva (born 10 December 1977 in Rio de Janeiro) is a Brazilian Pro License football coach and former Brazilian footballer who played as a midfielder. He recentely  commanded the Saint Kitts and Nevis national team, affiliated to CONCACAF. where he achieved an unprecedented classification for the second round of the Qatar World Cup Qualifiers.

Career

Recently, the Brazilian coach achieved a historic feat for the Caribbean national team. Léo Neiva led Saint Kitts and Nevis to the first place in Group F in the first round of Concacaf qualifiers for the 2022 World Cup, outperforming Trinidad and Tobago, Puerto Rico, Bahamas and Guyiana. This was the first time in history that the “Sugar Boyz” reached the second round of the qualifiers, being the only non-main team of the group to qualify. Under the command of the coach, Saint Kitts and Nevis improved from 27th place in the ranking of Concacaf, to 14th position.

Léo Neiva started his career as an assistant coach for América FC (Rio de Janeiro) in 2007. Then he accepted the invitation to take over the Platinum Stars FC (Royal Bafokeng) Academy in South Africa, which would be the first of 8 jobs done outside Brazil.

After this experience, the coach returned to Brazil in 2010 to lead the Bonsucesso-RJ team, where he was the head coach of the Senior team and also of the U’20. Then, Léo had the opportunity to take over Yadanarbon FC, where he had a lot of prominence in the work with young players. A large number of them reached the U’20 National Team that participated in the U’20 World Cup for the first time in history in New Zealand (2015).

This achievement put him in the spotlight in the country. His work was recognized and he had the opportunity to lead the Senior team of Rakhine United. At the time, he was the youngest coach to work in the Myanmar National League, at just 34 years old.

After the end of the contract with the Asian club, Léo again had the chance to return to Brazil, where he worked in Francana's team in the A3 Series of the São Paulo's Championship. The coach only returned to command a Brazilian club in 2019, when he accepted the challenge of commanding Clube Atlético Itapemirim, a team of Espírito Santo Championship. Between those comings and goings in the home country, the coach also attended the courses of CBF/CONMEBOL A and Pro Licenses.

Léo has accumulated an important international experience in his career, mainly outside his native country. The Coach has worked on 4 continents (Asia, Africa, North America [Caribbean] and South America). He recently spent a stint in Asia, where he managed in the Thailand Premier League. The invitation came after an excellent job done in his second stint at Yadanarbon FC, club of Myanmar.

In North America, Léo Neiva coached Jamaica's Montego Bay United FC League, having contributed to the National Title of the season (2015/2016). In Africa there were two passes, the first in South Africa by Platinum Stars FC, where he won the Nelson Mandela Cup in 2009, a kind of “Copa SP” in the country. Later, in Tanzania, he achieved the remarkable achievement of the National League of Tanzania and the Super Cup in 2014/2015 with Young African SC as an assistant coach.

Career as a player

Léo started his career in futsal at Fluminense FC. He soon migrated to field football where he played for the Bonsucesso FC. Still other experiences in the grassroots categories took place at Jacarepaguá FC and Juventude-RS.

For the professional, the attacking midfielder defended the EC Nova Cidade, club of the city of Nilópolis, in the State of Rio de Janeiro. He also accumulated stints for other clubs such as Portuguesa Santista and Vilanovense FC, from Portugal.

Honours
● Saint Kitts and Nevis National Team: Qualified for CONCACAF's Second Round of World Cup Qualifiers 2022 for the first time ever

Titles 

● National Championship - Jamaica 2016 Red Stripe Premier League 2015/2016 - Montego Bay FC

● National Championship - Tanzania 2015 Vodacom Premier League 2014/2015 - Young Africans SC

● Super Cup - Tanzania 2014 - Young Africans SC

● Nelson Mandela Cup - South Africa 2009 - Royal Bafokeng Platinum Stars FC

Qualifications 

● CBF / CONMEBOL Pro License Course - 2018/2019

● CBF / CONMEBOL A License Course - 2017

● Member of the Coaches Union of the State of Rio de Janeiro (STFPRJ) - 2008

● A License Course of the Brazilian Football Coaches Association (ABTF) - 2007

● Post-Graduation: Fundação Getúlio Vargas (FGV) - MBA Sports Administration - 2004

● Graduation: Universidade Castelo Branco - Physical Education - 2002

References

Brazilian football managers
Living people
1977 births
Saint Kitts and Nevis national football team managers
Sportspeople from Rio de Janeiro (city)
Brazilian expatriate football managers
Brazilian expatriate sportspeople in Saint Kitts and Nevis
Expatriate football managers in Saint Kitts and Nevis
Expatriate football managers in Thailand
Brazilian expatriate sportspeople in Thailand
Brazilian expatriate sportspeople in Myanmar
Expatriate football managers in Myanmar
Young Africans S.C. managers
Brazilian expatriate sportspeople in Tanzania
Expatriate football managers in Tanzania
Expatriate football managers in Jamaica
Brazilian expatriate sportspeople in Jamaica